Neha Oberoi is an Indian actress who has acted in Tollywood and Bollywood films.

Personal life
Oberoi is the daughter of film producer Dharam Oberoi and niece of director Sanjay Gupta. She married Indian diamond merchant Vishal Shah on 14 December 2010.

Career
She has appeared in the Bollywood films Dus Kahaniyaan, EMI and Woodstock Villa. She is currently shooting for an untitled film with Imran Khan.

Her foray into films started with the Telugu blockbuster Balu ABCDEFG and was followed by a role in one of the short films in Dus Kahaniyaan. Her role in Woodstock Villa won her much critical acclaim, yet the film failed to perform at the box office.She also worked in the famous 2005 remix song "SAJNA HAI MUJE"which was a major hit

Oberoi is a member of International Film And Television Club of Asian Academy of Film & Television, Noida.

Filmography
 Aasman (2009)
 Woodstock Villa (2008)
 EMI (2008)
 Dus Kahaniyaan (2007)
 Brahmastram (2006)
 Balu ABCDEFG (2005)

Awards
 Filmfare Best Supporting Actress Award (Telugu) - Balu ABCDEFG (2005)

References

External links 

 

Indian film actresses
Actresses in Hindi cinema
21st-century Indian actresses
Living people
Filmfare Awards South winners
Actresses from Mumbai
Actresses in Telugu cinema
Year of birth missing (living people)